Olga Shishkina (born 23 May 1985, Leningrad) is a Russian born gusli and kantele artist currently residing in Helsinki, Finland. She is known for her virtuosity and innovation reflected in developing new techniques and expanding the repertoire of the instrument.

Education 
Shishkina started to play gusli at the age of 8. In 1993–2001 she attended Andreev music school where she studied gusli, piano, balalaika and classical guitar. At the age of 16 she got the 2nd prize at 6th All-Russian Competition (2001, Tver) where she became the youngest prize winner in the competition’s history. Since then Shishkina has been performing at numerous festivals in Scandinavia, UK, Japan, USA, Switzerland and other countries. In 2003 she was accepted to St.Petersburg Rimsky-Korsakov Conservatory on exceptional basis without compulsory studies at music college. She majored in gusli, but at the same time also studied piano, organ and orchestral conducting. After graduating with the highest honours from the Conservatoire she continued her education at Sibelius Academy where she studied Finnish kantele, classical and jazz piano. Shishkina became the first foreigner to have graduated as a Master of Music in Finnish concert kantele in 2012. 
Since 2014 she has been holding a position of a board member of Kanteleliitto, Finnish kantele association. Shishkina has been a jury member at such competitions as International Kantele competition (Petrozavodsk, 2014) and International Kantele competition (Helsinki, 2015). Since 2015 a member of Finnish composers' copyright society "Teosto".

Collaborations 
Throughout her career Shishkina has been involved in different music genres. Since 2004 she has been playing in a duo with a Russian flutist Alexander Kiskachi where her instrument is a chromatic gusli. Other collaborations include work with such Finnish musicians as Timo Kämäräinen, Mika Mylläri, Terttu Iso-Oja and Saara Aalto and Estonian jazz guitarist Ain Agan. In 2013 she was invited as a special guest to perform at Jazz Harp Festival (Leiden, Netherlands) where she appeared together with a Grammy-nominated jazz harpist Deborah Henson-Conant. In January 2014 Shishkina was involved as both a musician and a composer in a theatre play "Finnphonia Emigrantica" produced by European Theatre Collective. The play got positive reviews in Finnish major newspapers.
Apart from gusli and kantele, Shishkina also appeared on Chinese guzheng on a few occasions.

Awards 
 International Youth Andreev Competition (1996– 3rd prize, 1998– 2nd prize, 2000– 3rd prize, St. Petersburg)
 6th All-Russian Competition (2001, Tver- 2nd prize)
 First Shalov Competition (2007, St.Petersburg – 1st prize)
 First International Kantele Competition (Helsinki, 2011– 3rd prize plus special prize from the Society of Finnish composers for her performance of Jukka Linkola’s “Terracotta lady”)

Recordings

Solo albums 

Olga Shishkina. Con Brillio (2010) ERP Estonian record productions

Appears also on 

Sound of Koli (2011), concert and electric kantele, Koistinen Kantele

Brazilian Aeroplane “Simetria: Bo Kasper in Brazil” (2010), electric kantele, piano

Saara Aalto “Angels” (2011), concert kantele

Pepe Deluxe “Queen of the Wave” (2011), wing-shaped and chromatic gusli

YLE Finnish broadcasting company TV Documentary production of Kati Juurus’ “Kaksi miestä Kiinasta” (2011), guzheng

Jukka Tiensuu YLE radio recording, Egregore (2012), concert kantele

References

Links 
 http://www.olgashishkina.me
 http://www.folkmanystringedinstruments.spbu.ru/1_0.htm?0
 http://www.erpmusic.com/artists/instrumentalists/olga-shishkina
 http://www.sirp.ee/index.php?option=com_content&view=article&id=12782:mozarti-maeng-ja-monda-&catid=5:muusika&Itemid=12&issue=3353

Kantele players
Living people
1985 births
Saint Petersburg Conservatory alumni
Sibelius Academy alumni
Russian expatriates in Finland